"A Case for Shame" is a song by American electronica musician Moby. It was released as the first official single from his eleventh studio album Innocents on July 1, 2013. The track is a collaboration with Canadian singer-songwriter Cold Specks.

Background 
Moby first came into contact with Cold Specks due to their mutual connection as Mute Records label mates, and after listening to her 2012 album I Predict a Graceful Expulsion, he invited her to collaborate. The two recorded the songs "A Case for Shame" and "Tell Me", the former in November 2012 while Cold Specks was on tour in the United Kingdom. Cold Specks described the recording process as "a very free, collaborative, creative environment... He was really open to what I was doing and luckily he liked what I was doing and it worked really well."

Music video 
The music video for "A Case of Shame" was directed by Moby and released on July 17, 2013. Filmed in a pool in his Los Angeles home, the clip's premise was described by Moby as being about "an after-life inhabited by people who are concealing themselves because of shame."

Track listing
 Digital download
"A Case for Shame"  – 5:48
"A Case for Shame"  – 5:58
"A Case for Shame"  – 6:19
 Digital download – remixes 
"A Case for Shame"  – 8:42
"A Case for Shame"  – 8:38
"A Case for Shame"  – 6:33
"A Case for Shame"  – 6:34

Charts

References

External links 
 

2013 singles
2013 songs
Moby songs
Songs written by Moby
Song recordings produced by Spike Stent